The 2022 Missouri Tigers football team represented the University of Missouri in the 2022 NCAA Division I FBS football season. The Tigers played their home games at Faurot Field in Columbia, Missouri, and competed in the Eastern Division of the Southeastern Conference (SEC). They were led by third-year head coach Eliah Drinkwitz.

Offseason

Recruiting

The Tigers signed the #15 ranked recruiting class (according to Rivals) prior to the 2022 season, headlined by wide receiver Luther Burden III from East St. Louis, Illinois and quarterback Sam Horn from Suwanee, Georgia.

Schedule
Missouri and the SEC announced the 2022 football schedule on September 21, 2021.

Coaching staff

Roster

Game summaries

Louisiana Tech

at Kansas State

at Auburn

No. 1 Georgia

at Florida

vs Vanderbilt

Statistics

at No. 5 Tennessee

vs Arkansas

References

Missouri
Missouri Tigers football seasons
Missouri Tigers football